Luis María Piñerúa Ordaz (20 April 1924 - 8 February 2001) was the Democratic Action presidential candidate in the 1978 Venezuelan general election, losing to COPEI's Luis Herrera Campins. He held the post of Minister of Home Affairs of Venezuela in both the First Presidency of Carlos Andrés Pérez and Second Presidency of Carlos Andrés Pérez.

References

1924 births
2001 deaths
People from Güiria
Democratic Action (Venezuela) politicians
Venezuelan Ministers of Interior
Governors of Monagas
Prisoners and detainees of Venezuela